Dietrich Keller (born 18 October 1943) is a former German basketball player. He competed in the men's tournament at the 1972 Summer Olympics.

References

1943 births
Living people
German men's basketball players
Olympic basketball players of West Germany
Basketball players at the 1972 Summer Olympics
Sportspeople from Mainz
USC Heidelberg players